I Think They Call Him John is a British short film, written and directed by John Krish and produced by Jack Carruthers, with Anne Balfour-Fraser serving as the film's executive producer, for Samaritan Films. Made in 1964, it is a narrated observation of an elderly, lonely man during one day of his life.

It was released at the Polish Film Festival in Warsaw.

Narrative 

An elderly man, Mr John Cartner Ronson (born 5 January 1889, died about 1965) has lost his wife some 9 years previously and now lives a humdrum life in a small flat on a modern housing estate. The film records him going about his daily routine, cleaning, preparing modest meals and interacting with his pet budgerigar, even sleeping. The film is intended to demonstrate Mr Cartner Ronson's solitude in old age and isolation from society in spite of the great contribution he has made in his earlier life as a miner, soldier and gardener. There is within the film an intention to rouse guilt for the lack of integration and appreciation that modern society then provided for this man. Most of the film is shot inside the flat with a few outside context shots showing the density of the buildings contrasting with the insularity of Mr Cartner Ronson's existence. Throughout the film the subject is afforded great tenderness, respect, and dignity.

Production 

The film was shot on 35 mm, black and white film by David Muir.

Recorded without sound, it is narrated by Victor Spinetti and Bessie Love.

References

External links 
 
 

1964 films
Films directed by John Krish
British short documentary films
Documentary films about old age
1960s short documentary films
1960s English-language films
1960s British films